The Marrakesh ePrix is a race of the single-seater, electrically powered Formula E championship, held in Marrakesh, Morocco. It was first raced in the 2016–17 season.

Circuit
The Marrakesh ePrix is held on the temporary Circuit International Automobile Moulay El Hassan. It is located in the Agdal district of Marrakech.

Results

References

External links

 
Marrakesh
Motorsport in Morocco
Sports competitions in Marrakesh
Recurring sporting events established in 2016
2016 establishments in Morocco